MDEA may refer to:

Methyl diethanolamine (N-methyl-diethanolamine), CH3N(C2H4OH)2, a chemical used for amine gas treating, also known as gas sweetening or acid gas removal, the removal of hydrogen sulfide and carbon dioxide from gasses in the petrochemical industry
Methylenedioxyethylamphetamine (3,4-methylenedioxy-N-ethylamphetamine), C12H17NO2, an analog of the drug MDMA